Distillation Design is a book which provides complete coverage of the design of industrial distillation columns for the petroleum refining, chemical and petrochemical plants, natural gas processing, pharmaceutical, food and alcohol distilling industries. It has been a classical chemical engineering textbook since it was first published in February 1992.

The subjects covered in the book include:

Vapor–liquid equilibrium(VLE): Vapor–liquid K values, relative volatilities, ideal and non-ideal systems, phase diagrams, calculating bubble points and dew points
Key fractional distillation concepts: theoretical stages, x-y diagrams, multicomponent distillation, column composition and temperature profiles
Process design and optimization: minimum reflux and minimum stages, optimum reflux, short-cut methods, feed entry location
Rigorous calculation methods: Bubble point method, sum rates method, numerical methods (Newton–Raphson technique), inside out method, relaxation method, other methods
Batch distillation: Simple distillation, constant reflux, varying reflux, time and boilup requirements
Tray design and tray efficiency: tray types, tray capacities, tray hydraulic parameters, tray sizing and determination of column diameter, point and tray efficiencies, tray efficiency prediction and scaleup
Packing design and packing efficiency: packing types, packing hydraulics and capacities, determination of packing efficiency by transfer unit method and by HETP method, packed column sizing

See also

External links
McGraw Hill website page

Distillation
Engineering textbooks
Science books
Technology books